ArbiterSports is the sports officiating software company of the National Collegiate Athletic Association, and is a venture between two NCAA subsidiaries, Arbiter LLC and  LLC.  The company is based in Sandy, Utah.

History
The Arbiter assigning system was created in 1984 by Advanced Business Technology, at the request of the Utah High School Activities Association, who hired ABT to build a computerized method of assigning sports officials to matches and managing their assignments.  Known as TheArbiter, the software was originally released on the MS-DOS platform, then for Microsoft Windows in 1997.  Arbiter was released as a web application in 2003, known as TheArbiter.NET. Dave Yeast, former National Coordinator of Baseball Umpires for the NCAA, has served as the firm's vice president of officiating education.

Acquisition by the NCAA
Arbiter was acquired by the NCAA in September 2008. The NCAA said their purpose in the acquisition, along with their acquisition of  LLC the same month, was to improve the quality and consistency of officiating at all levels of play.

Data breach 2020

Arbiter experienced a data breach in 2020 and was charged with a class action lawsuit. The court did not favor any decisions and a settlement was reached upon by all the parties involved for $26 million USD in 2021.

Notes

External links
NCAA
ArbiterSports official webpage

Sports companies
Sports officiating technology
Sports software
American companies established in 1984
Software companies established in 1984